Antonia Johanna "Tonnie" Hom (4 September 1932 – 23 August 2013) was a Dutch swimmer. She competed in the 200 m breaststroke at the 1948 Olympics and finished in seventh place.

References

1932 births
2013 deaths
Dutch female breaststroke swimmers
Olympic swimmers of the Netherlands
Swimmers at the 1948 Summer Olympics
Sportspeople from Hilversum
20th-century Dutch women